Marc-Kevin Goellner and Greg Rusedski won in the final 6–3, 7–6 against Rodolphe Gilbert and Nuno Marques.

Seeds
Champion seeds are indicated in bold text while text in italics indicates the round in which those seeds were eliminated.

 Neil Broad /  Piet Norval (first round)
 Stephen Noteboom /  Jack Waite (semifinals)
 Tom Kempers /  Tom Nijssen (quarterfinals)
 Rodolphe Gilbert /  Nuno Marques (final)

Draw

References
 1996 Bournemouth International Doubles Draw

Men's Doubles
Doubles
Sport in Bournemouth